The 1960 Gator Bowl was a post-season college football bowl game between the Florida Gators representing the Southeastern Conference (SEC) and the Baylor Bears of the Southwest Conference (SWC). Florida defeated Baylor 13–12. Both quarterbacks were the game's Most Valuable Player: Florida's Larry Libertore and Baylor's Bobby Ply.

Game summary
Led by Vic Miranda, the Gator defense halted a 75-yard drive by Baylor on the half-yard line in the first quarter, setting the stage for two second quarter touchdowns. Baylor running back Ronnie Goodwin dropped the winning 2-point try in the closing seconds. Baylor quarterback Bobby Ply set a Gator Bowl record with 13 completions.

References

External links
Video of game

Gator Bowl
Gator Bowl
Florida Gators football bowl games
Baylor Bears football bowl games
20th century in Jacksonville, Florida
Gator Bowl
Gator Bowl (December)